Louise Hall may refer to:

Louise Hall (academic) (1905–1990), professor of art and architecture at Duke University
Louise Hall (suffragist) (1881–1966), American suffragist
Louise Hall Tharp (1898–1992), American biographer